Drunken Birds is a Canadian drama film, directed by Ivan Grbovic and released in 2021. The film stars Jorge Antonio Guerrero as Willy, a Mexican drug runner in a crime cartel who travels to Canada in search of his girlfriend Marlena (Yoshira Escárrega) after she disappears, and takes a job as a migrant worker on a farm in the Montérégie region.

The film's cast also includes Hélène Florent, Claude Legault, Marine Johnson, Maxime Dumontier, Amaryllis Tremblay, Karl Walcott, Gilberto Barraza, and Normand D'Amour.

The film premiered at the 2021 Toronto International Film Festival, in the Platform Prize program. The film was digitally and theatrically released in Canada is on October 15, 2021, by Les Films Opale. It was selected as the Canadian entry for the Best International Feature Film at the 94th Academy Awards.

Synopsis
Marlena is the young wife of a powerful wealthy man in Mexico, Willy is her secret lover. Fearing the worst, the lovers will flee separately in the hopes of finding each other in a safer place. Willy suspects that Marlena is hiding in Montreal, so he escapes to Quebec where he is hired as a seasonal worker at the Bécotte Farm. While friendships are being forged between foreign workers on the farm, a gap is growing between the Bécotte family members. Willy, unknowingly, will arouse the desire in Julie, the wife of the owner. The situation will not be without consequences for the group - especially for her estranged teenage daughter Léa, who soon finds herself exploited after running away in search of freedom. Willy is accused of a crime he did not commit, which sends a ripple effect through the lives of all, leading to an eventual redemption.

Cast

Reception 
Jared Mobarak of The Film Stage gave the film a positive review writing, "Writer/director Ivan Grbovic and co-writer/cinematographer Sara Mishara seamlessly take us back and forth through time so the romance at the center of their Les oiseaux ivres [Drunken Birds] can unfold with mystery and anticipation." Another positive review was written by Pat Mullen for That Shelf: "Exceptionally crafted with its feet firmly planted between two worlds, Drunken Birds represents the best that is happening in Canadian cinema right now. It challenges us to look at the landscape we love and wonder if it looks so golden from another perspective. Drunken Birds is the best film the TIFF Platform competition had to offer this year and a Canadian standout for the year overall."

The film was named to TIFF's annual year-end Canada's Top Ten list for 2021.

Awards

See also
 List of submissions to the 94th Academy Awards for Best International Feature Film
 List of Canadian submissions for the Academy Award for Best International Feature Film

References

External links

Drunken Birds at micro_scope

2021 films
2021 drama films
Canadian drama films
Films directed by Ivan Grbovic
Films shot in Quebec
Films set in Quebec
Best Film Prix Iris winners
French-language Canadian films
Spanish-language Canadian films
2020s Canadian films